Barna Woods is an area of mixed broadleaf woodland located in Barna, County Galway, Ireland. The woods are approximately 3 miles from Galway city centre near Galway Bay. The Woods are accessible from Cappagh park which is located in Knocknacara or from Barna Road (Coastal Road - R336) where there is a small carpark. Other sections of the Woods include an area across the road known as the South Wood which leads to marshlands ending in the Silver Strand on Galway Bay.

Ecological importance
The woods are owned by Galway City Council and are open to the public. They are managed as part of a large Special Area of Conservation, the Galway Bay Complex, which protects a diverse range of marine, coastal and terrestrial habitats.

References

External links
 http://www.irelands-directory.com/Galway/Barna/Tourism/photos.html
 http://www.galwaybarnawoods.com/

Forests and woodlands of the Republic of Ireland
Protected areas of County Galway
Special Areas of Conservation in the Republic of Ireland